Hawiyyat Najm, known as Bimmah Sinkhole in English, is a water-filled depression, structurally a sinkhole, in the limestone of eastern Muscat Governorate in the Sultanate of Oman, very close to the Al Sharqiyah region just off the highway to Sur, few kilometers before Tiwi.

Location
To preserve the sinkhole, the local municipality developed a fenced and toilet-equipped park, Hawiyat Najm Park, around it, along with a stairway leading down to the hole.

Geology
A lake of turquoise waters, it is 50 m by 70 m wide and approximately 20 m deep.  It is only about 600 m away from the sea, between the coastal towns of Ḑibāb and Bamah (Bimmah). The sinkhole was formed by a collapse of the surface layer due to dissolution of the underlying limestone. However, locals used to believe this sinkhole in the shape of a water well was created by a meteorite, hence the Arabic name Hawiyyat Najm which means "the deep well of the (falling) star".

Bimmah Sinkhole ranges in depth from only a few feet to over 300+ feet in the deepest part.

Gallery

Notes and references

Sinkholes of Asia
Landforms of Oman
Muscat Governorate